The Great Industrialist is a 1923 German silent film directed by Fritz Kaufmann and starring Walter Brügmann, Maria Forescu and Erich Kaiser-Titz.

The film's sets were designed by the art director Fritz Kraenke.

Cast
 Walter Brügmann as Harry W. Marton
 Maria Forescu as Gesellschafterin
 Erich Kaiser-Titz as John Johnston
 Erna Morena
 Claire Rommer
 Kurt Vespermann

References

Bibliography
 Alfred Krautz. International directory of cinematographers, set- and costume designers in film, Volume 4. Saur, 1984.

External links

1923 films
Films of the Weimar Republic
German silent feature films
Films directed by Fritz Kaufmann
German black-and-white films
1920s German films